This is a list of radio stations in the Mexican state of Campeche, which can be sorted by their call signs, frequencies, location, ownership, names, and programming formats.

Notes

References 

Campeche
Campeche